Neil Barrett may refer to:

Neil Barrett (footballer) (born 1981), English footballer
Neil Barrett (fashion designer) (born 1965), English fashion designer
Neal Barrett Jr. (1929–2014), American writer
Neil R. Barrett (born 1992), Irish rugby union player
Deckscar (Neil Barrett, born 1986), DJ and music producer